Noduliferola anepsia is a species of moth of the family Tortricidae. It is found in New Caledonia.

The wingspan is about 14 mm. The ground colour of the forewings is white, strigulated (finely streaked) with brown along the dorsum to before the tornus. The remaining area is pale brownish grey, darkening along the costa. The hindwings are brownish, but whiter towards the base.

Etymology
The species name refers to the similarity to Noduliferola neothela and is derived from Greek anepsia (meaning nice).

References

Moths described in 2013
Eucosmini